Autograss racing is a form of amateur motor racing in Britain. Races are held at venues throughout the UK and Ireland. Its origins can be traced back to the 1960s.

Autograss races take place usually on tracks of roughly 400 metres with grass or mud surfaces. Most meetings are held and promoted by non-profit-making clubs, which are affiliated to the sport's governing body, the National Autograss Sports Association. The National Championships consist of one event held each year for men's classes and one for ladies and junior classes, which usually take place between August and September.

There are eleven classes of car ranging from production saloons to the single-seat 'specials'.

Classes of car

Class 1
The cars are standard 1000cc Minis. As with all Autograss cars they have the trim, dashboard and seats removed. The engine is standard with limited modification allowed (rebored +60 etc.). The only engine capacity allowed is 998cc bar Minis which may be modified too 1058cc to compensate . Juniors, ages 10–16, are allowed to drive class 1 cars in separate races. This class was previously restricted to Minis, but the Peugeot 106, Nissan Micra, Toyota Yaris and Citroën AX have been added to the list of eligible cars from 2006. Other experimental cars are being added to the list as the classic Mini is becoming more expensive and harder to source and is no longer as competitive against the more modern cars being allowed in. The intention of class 1 racing is to maintain an entry level class that can be constructed at a low cost, with an initial outlay of under £500 and minimal running costs at club level, although race winning cars and versions that are competitive at national level tend to cost about ten times that figure and more.

Class 2 
Is open to front or rear wheel drive cars up to 1300cc. The engine can be either front or rear. Cars seen most regularly in this class are Vauxhall Novas, Nissan Micras and Ford Fiestas. Since the introduction of front wheel drive cars into this class, the Vauxhall Nova has become a popular car amongst class 2 drivers. Only 2 valve/cylinder cars are allowed and there is a minimum length requirement, preventing use of 1275cc Minis and Metros. The inlet manifold is fitted with a restrictor, to even out performance amongst the vast collection of vehicles used.

Class 3 
Is the first of the unlimited capacity classes. The cars must have engines at the front and be rear wheel drive. This class allows front wheel drive cars to be converted to rear wheel drive and 16v engines with a maximum of 2065cc, engines with two valves per cylinder are unlimited in cc. This leads to powerful cars which are lightweight and fast. Examples of cars in this class are Toyota Starlets, MKII Ford Escorts and Ford Anglias.

Class 4 
Is a modified class, with engine capacities allowed up to 1130cc. Any engine modification is allowed, except turbo and super charging. Engines are extensively modified to bring them to a competitive level, as a specific of the rules is that the original engine and position are retained. Examples of cars in this class are Minis, Hillman Imps, Citroen Saxos, Nissan Micras and Peugeot 106s.

Class 5 
Is a very popular starting point for people wanting to drive modified saloons. Engine capacities from 1131 to 1420cc are allowed, the engine does not have to be the original or in the original position. A lot of cars run rear engines to help improve grip.

Class 6
Is for cars with unlimited engine capacity and modifications in a front engine/front wheel drive combination. Costs can be in the region of £2000 to £10000.

Class 7 
Is restricted to rear wheel drive cars. The engines are unlimited, but must be above 1421cc, or 1000cc if a bike engine. Many class 7 cars use motorcycle engines, in which case 2 engines may be used to power the vehicle. Quite often large sums of money are spent on the engines for these cars, including Cosworth turbo motors, large block American V8s, and V6s of different types, all highly tuned.

Class 8 
Is the most competitive of the Special Classes and has lowest engine capacity limit, a maximum of 1420cc for car engine specials and 1350cc for bike engine specials. Engines may be tuned, but not be turbo or super charged. The high majority of cars are rear-engine; this is not part of the regulations but is the most effective way to get the most weight over the wheels.

Class 9 
Is the class most likely to win an open-class race. This class combines the high power output of the modern 2.0 litre engine with the lightness to allow better handling than the heavier class 10 vehicles. The capacity limits are between 1421cc and 2070cc and any modifications are allowed, with the usual exception of turbo and supercharging. All cars are mid-engine with most utilizing a transverse gearbox layout and rear wheel drive.

Class 10 
Is one of the most powerful classes within Autograss racing. Another of the purpose-built classes, this one has a minimum capacity of 2071cc but no upper capacity limit or limit on the modifications made to the engine (except that motorcycle engines may not have forced induction). Twin bike engines are popular with the capacity limits being between 1550cc and 4000cc, as is V8 power. This is the class where racers on a budget can get real value for their money with a relatively small amount of money being spent for the power although car build budgets can extend to over £50,000.

Junior Specials
This consists of single seaters in which all cars have an almost standard 1.2 Vauxhall Corsa engine. As with the junior class one saloons, this class is for 10- to 16-year-olds.

Other classes
There are some other classes found in specific clubs for example F600's were designed to be a cheaper less powerful special that was designed to give drivers easier access into the special classes. The specifications are single 600cc engines situated in the rear with the power going towards the rear wheels. The F600's are used mainly by smaller clubs but can be found everywhere.

There is also a Stock Hatch class which use near standard saloons up to 1600cc capacity.

Neither class is recognized as a stand-alone class by the governing body (NASA), when they race they have to race in Class 8 or 9 for F600s and Class 6 for Stock Hatch.

See also
 British autocross
 FIA Autocross
 Folkrace

External links
 National Autograss Sport Association Official Website

Auto racing by type